The 2012 Junior League World Series took place from August 12–18 in Taylor, Michigan, United States. Rockledge, Florida defeated Oranjestad, Aruba in the championship game. It was Florida's second straight championship.

Teams

Results

United States Pool

International Pool

Elimination Round

References

Junior League World Series
Junior League World Series